Daniel Schuhmacher (born 19 April 1987) is a German singer and songwriter. In 2009, he rose to fame after winning the sixth season of Deutschland sucht den Superstar, the German edition of Pop Idol. His debut album The Album was released later in the same year and topped the German and Austrian Albums Charts, going gold. It spawned the hit single "Anything but Love", his coronation song, which became a number-one hit Austria, Germany, and Switzerland and was also certified gold.

Early life
Schuhmacher was born and raised in Pfullendorf, Baden-Württemberg. Schuhmacher's hobbies are tennis, music, skating, meeting friends, movies, and films. His nicknames are Kell, Kelly, and Schumi. He has 4 tattoos which are located on the hip, neck and both wrists.

Career

2008–09: Deutschland sucht den Superstar

Post-DSDS
Schuhmacher's coronation song "Anything but Love" was released by Sony Music on 15 May 2009. Upon its release, it debuted at number-one on the Austrian, German and Swiss Singles Charts, scoring the highest first week single sales of the year in Germany. The single sold 270.000 copies in total and was eventually certified gold by the Bundesverband Musikindustrie (BVMI) and the International Federation of the Phonographic Industry of Austria (IFPI). It was later included on his debut album, The Album (2009), which was released in June 2009. Helmed by DSDS judge Dieter Bohlen's Dreamfactory, it debuted at number one on German Albums Chart and was eventually certified gold by the Bundesverband Musikindustrie (BVMI), selling 137.000 within the first nine months of its release. Critics praised Schuhmacher's vocal performance on the album, but dismissed Bohlen's production and lyrics ambitions. In September 2009, Bohlen and Schuhmacher ended their collaboration.

Personal life
In May 2014, Schuhmacher came out as gay in an interview with IN.

Discography

Studio albums

Singles

Awards

References

External links
 Official website of Daniel Schuhmacher 
 Official Myspace of Daniel Schuhmacher

1987 births
Living people
People from Pfullendorf
Deutschland sucht den Superstar winners
Gay singers
German LGBT singers
German gay musicians
21st-century German male singers
20th-century LGBT people
21st-century German LGBT people